St Peter's Church, Hayton is a Grade I listed parish church in the Church of England in Hayton, Nottinghamshire.

History

The church dates from the 12th century, with restoration in the 19th century.

References

12th-century church buildings in England
Church of England church buildings in Nottinghamshire
Grade I listed churches in Nottinghamshire